The 3rd Executive Council of the People's Republic of Croatia was the state's executive branch of government from 1958 to 1963. The Executive Council was voted in at a joint session of the Republican Council and the Council of Producers on 10 April 1958.

Members

References

Bibliography

Socialist Republic of Croatia
League of Communists of Croatia
Cabinets established in 1958
Cabinets disestablished in 1963